Phobia 2 (lit. "Five Crossroads") is a 2009 Thai anthology horror film consisting of five shorts: "Novice" directed by Paween Purijitpanya, "Ward" by Visute Poolvoralaks, "Backpackers" by Songyos Sugmakanan, "Salvage" by Parkpoom Wongpoom, and "In the End" by Banjong Pisanthanakun. It is the sequel to the 2008 anthology horror film 4bia.

Synopsis

Phobia 2 is dissected into five shorts stories as follows:

Novice 

"Novice" (หลาวชะโอน; "Nibung") was directed by Paween Purijitpanya.

Pey is a fourteen-year-old rebel and delinquent who repeatedly commits crimes of throwing rocks at oncoming cars before looting them. One day, he throws a rock at the car of his own father, mistaking him for a normal driver. His father dies immediately.

To avoid being found, Pey's mother has her son ordained at a remote temple in a southern forest. At the temple, Pey witnesses an annual ceremony of feeding the ghost being punished for its sinful deeds. On that night, Pey feels hungry and goes out of his monastic cell to find something to eat, although the precepts prohibit monks from eating at night. Pey walks to the place where the ceremony was held and eats the offerings dedicated to the ghost. But he is caught by his preceptor and is brought back to his cell. The next morning, the monks inspect the area where Pey entered last night and see that the nibung tree where the ghost's offerings were placed was broken. A senior monk says this is an omen indicating the time for the departure of the existing ghost and the coming of a new ghost.

After days at the temple, Pey cannot bear the strict precepts any longer. Moreover, after consuming the ghost's offerings, he feels like he has been followed by the ghost. Pey then decides to leave the monkhood. The aged abbot begs him to stay, hoping that the religion could clean his mind a little bit more. But Pey flings the abbot down to the floor and continues to walk out of the forest. He is stopped by his preceptor. The preceptor leads him to a cave where Buddha images are installed and instructs him to stay there and meditate in order to calm himself down and realise the wrong he has done.

That night, Pey again decides to leave the monkhood due to unrest within his mind after he recalls his wrongful deeds. While he is walking out of the forest, he feels like something is following him. He then throws rocks at it but the rocks come back to him and hit him at his face that he becomes severely disfigured. Pey attempts to call his mother for help but she only hears a high pitched cry like that of a punished ghost according to traditional belief. Tearfully repenting his crimes, Pey transforms into the new ghost.

Ward

"Ward" (ห้องเตียงรวม; "Shared Room") was directed by Visute Poolvoralaks.

Arthit is a playful teenager who crashes his bike and fractures both his legs, requiring him to spend the night in a hospital. He is moved from the emergency room into a shared room, where he meets an old shaman in a coma who has been waiting for almost a month for his family to decide to pull the plug on his life support. The plug is scheduled to be pulled the next day, as the last group of his students and family members need to travel from the north to see him.

As the night progresses, Arthit begins to see strange things, such as a tray of food left for the old man suddenly disappearing. He unsuccessfully requests an aged nurse who is responsible for the room to move him to another room. Seeing Arthit refuses to remain there, the nurse forcibly puts him to sleep through injection of hypnotic. As the night draws to an end, Arthit is suddenly awakened by the old man walking on his chest and reciting certain spells. The old man then attacks him and vomits blood into his mouth, thereby rendering him unconscious.

The next morning, a young nurse comes to check on Arthit and discharges him from the hospital. As Arthit is leaving on a wheelchair pushed forwards by the old man's family, the old man's students, amongst whom are the aged nurse and some other hospital staff members, bow to Arthit. This means the old man has successfully transferred his soul to a new body, Arthit's body, with the help of the hospital staff.

Backpackers

"Backpacker" was directed by Songyos Sugmakanan.

Backpackers begins with two Japanese travelers (a boy and a girl) hitchhiking through the Thai countryside with no luck. No one will pick them up until the Japanese boy waves a thousand baht note at a truck passing by which stops to pick them up. The truck is driven by a rough man who immediately extorts them for more money and a young man named Joi who refers to the older as 'boss' and asks him not to pick up the passengers. However, the travelers realise that something is wrong when the driver repeatedly gets phone calls that sets him shouting down "don't make trouble!" and when there is a continuous loud banging from the back of the truck.

The driver eventually drives the wrong way and holds the travelers hostage at gunpoint while he and Joi check the truck. They open up the cargo and is surprised when they see the truck filled with dead bodies as flashbacks reveal that the two men are father and son who work as drug runner; they transport people who swallowed buns of drugs and tried to keep them alive, but eventually fail. The Japanese boy gains the upper hand by getting the gun, but the dead bodies return to life and kill him, after which the two men and the Japanese girl run for their lives as the zombies chase them, though the truck eventually crashes down and the zombies kill the driver.

Joi and the Japanese girl wake up at evening and find that the bodies have become motionless again. Joi checks his father and finds him dead with his stomach cut open, while the Japanese girl sees a corpse of a boy return to life, seemingly innocent. The Japanese girl shoots Joi dead when he tries to unsuccessfully convince her to abandon the boy due to a language barrier. She and the boy drive a stray car (which crashed the truck earlier) away. Arriving at a market, the Japanese girl tries to shoot the boy while he sleeps, but he suddenly wakes up and kills her before running towards the market maniacally.

Salvage

"Salvage" (รถมือสอง; "Second Hand Car") was directed by Parkpoom Wongpoom.

Nuch is a car dealer with a difference. She makes her comfortable living by rebuilding severely damaged cars, many from fatal accidents, and sells them to the unsuspecting with a sweet smile and a hand shake. But little do these unsuspecting bargain hunters know that beneath the new upholstery and shiny repainted exteriors are cars with horrific pasts.

One night after closing the car garage, Nuch discovers her son, Toey, is missing. She tries to look for her son in her compound and is spooked by the ghosts of accident victims, including a mutilated vendor, a boy stuck in a car wheel, and a woman with her belly cut open, revealing her dangling intestines. Nuch gets locked in a car and witnesses how a victim got burnt to death in the car during an accident. Eventually she manages to escape to find that all of the refurbished cars have returned to their original destroyed state. Nuch tries to drive away with her own car, but the engine sounds weird and suddenly dies. She steps out and finds her son's shoe in front of the car. Bracing herself for the worst, Nuch opens the bonnet of the car. There, she finds her little boy, incinerated by the engine of the car. The part ends with Nuch crying motionlessly to her body-squashed dead little son.

In the End

"In the End" (คนกอง; "Crew") was directed by Banjong Pisanthanakun.

Ter, Puak, Shin and Aey are the movie crew of an upcoming ghost/horror movie Alone 2, starring Marsha as the lead character and Kate, who is sick, as the ghost. They are shooting the last scene where the ghost appears crawling out of a dark hallway, but Kate collapses. Aey takes Kate to a hospital, at which the doctor later tells Aey that "the patient has died". Thinking that Kate would be unable to join the filming, the crew discuss a possible ending change. But Kate appears in the set shortly and seems alive enough, prompting the change to be reversed.

Kate asks Shin to take her to the toilet at the same time when Aey phones him, telling him that Kate has died. Shocked, he passes Kate to Marsha and tells Ter and Puak about Kate's death. The rest of the studio (except Marsha) overhear their conversation through the microphone and hastily leave the set. Having no choice, the three and an oblivious Marsha decide to shoot the final scene to appease Kate's wish to complete the film. However, the power gets off and a ghostly Kate pursues Ter, Puak and Shin who drive off the set, leaving a confused Marsha behind.

The trio see Aey standing alone on the road and pick him up. When they see the remnant of his car crashed into another car, they initially think that Aey had died and his ghost is haunting them. Aey tells them that he is still alive and he managed to leave his car with minor injuries before the other car hit him. Kate suddenly appears, much to their shock. However, she tells them that she is not a ghost; she secretly left the hospital to join the crew and the doctor whom Aey met is the twin of another doctor. One of the twin doctors is in charge of Kate, the other was in charge of another dead patient and informed Aey of the patient's death because he mistook Aey for the deceased's relative. As they wave for a car to bring Kate back to the hospital, a car driven by a sleepy Marsha crashes all of them off.

 Note: The characters of Ter, Puak, Shin, and Aey also starred in the short story "The Man In The Middle" from 4bia, the film's predecessor. The fictional film Alone 2 is likely an allusion to director Banjong Pisanthanakun's previous film Alone, also starring Marsha Wattanapanich as the lead character.

Cast

 Novice
 Jirayu Laongmanee as Pey
 Apasiri Nitibhon as Pey's Mother
 Chumporn Theppitak as Abbot
 Ray MacDonald as Preceptor

 Ward
 Worrawech Danuwong as Arthit
 Chartpawee Treechartchawanwong as Young Nurse
 Gecha Plienwithi as Shaman

 Backpackers
 Charlie Trairat as Joi
 Sutheerush Channukool as Driver
 Akiko Ozeki as Japanese Girl
 Theerneth Yuki Tanaka as Japanese Boy

 Salvage
 Nicole Theriault as Nuch
 Peeratchai Roompol as Toey

 In The End
 Marsha Wattanapanich as Marsha
 Nattapong Chartpong as Ter
 Kantapat Permpoonpatcharasuk as Aey 
 Wiwat Krongrasri as Shin
 Pongsatorn Jongwilas as Puak
 Phijitra Ratsameechawalit as Kate
 Nimitr Lugsameepong as Director

Production
The movie is produced by GTH GMM Thai Hub, following the successful previous film, 4bia.

Release
The movie premiered on 9 September 2009 in Thailand and is part of the 2010 San Diego Comic-Con International.

Reception
It was a big hit, making 15.5 Million Baht on its opening day and 64.4 Million Baht in its opening week, highest in Thailand's movie history.

References

External links
 

2009 films
2009 horror films
Thai horror films
Thai horror anthology films
GMM Tai Hub films
Thai supernatural horror films